Runway is a 2009 action thriller directed by Suneil and Praful Tiwari.

Plot
With a hand on the trigger and an eye on the casino owner Victor, Allan (Amarjeet) goes to Mauritius. Back home in Daman is the reason he has turned into a contract killer -Melvyna (Deepal Shaw), a victim of drug abuse.

Mauritius is full of colourful characters like Shaina (Tulip Joshi), a dancer in the casino; Khalid (Lucky Ali), an assassin on Interpol's wanted list and David (Shawar Ali), a casino owner.

As the story unfolds we find out if Allan saves Melvyna, outsmarts the smartest crooks around and hits his target.

Cast
 Amarjeet Shukla...... Allan
 Tulip Joshi...... Shaina
 Lucky Ali...... Khalid Azmi
 Deepal Shaw...... Melvyna Bajaj
 Shawar Ali...... David
 Sharat Saxena...... Anthony
 Rauf Lala...... Rauf
 Ishrat Ali
 Vida Samadzai
 Dayanand Shetty
 Nagesh Bhonsle

Music

Tracks
 Khuda Ke Liye - Mustafa Zahid
 Khuda Ke Liye (Remix) - Mustafa Zahid
 Pyaasi Machuriya - Sunidhi Chauhan
 Roshan Dil Ka Jahan - Shaan, Sunidhi Chauhan
 Roshan Dil Ka Jahan (Dance Mix) -  Sunidhi Chauhan
 Teri Yaadein - KK
 Teri Yaadein (Remix) - KK

References

External links
 

2009 films
2000s Hindi-language films
Films scored by Shamir Tandon